is a Japanese politician and the governor of Kanagawa Prefecture located in Kantō region of Japan.

Biography
Kuroiwa was born on 26 September 1954 in Kobe, the capital city of Hyōgo Prefecture in Kansai region of Japan. A graduate of Waseda University, Kuroiwa became the governor of Kanagawa Prefecture on April 23, 2011, and has held the position for almost 10 years.

References

External links
  

People from Kobe
Politicians from Hyōgo Prefecture
Waseda University alumni
Governors of Kanagawa Prefecture
1954 births
Living people